The FIL World Luge Championships 1962 took place in Krynica, Poland. This was the city's second time hosting the event, doing so previously in 1958.

Men's singles

Women's singles

Men's doubles

Medal table

References
Men's doubles World Champions
Men's singles World Champions
Women's singles World Champions

FIL World Luge Championships
1962 in luge
1996 in Polish sport
Luge in Poland